The 20th Artistic Gymnastics World Championships were held in Fort Worth, United States, in 1979. In November 1977 the 55th FIG Congress, held in Rome, changed the cycle of world championships: since 1979 they were to be held each two years, and the pre-Olympic ones were to be qualifications for the Olympic tournament. The first 12 teams in the team competition of the 1979 World Championships were invited to participate in the 1980 Summer Olympics.

These were the first World Championships in artistic gymnastics to be held outside of Europe, and the first that China competed at since 1962 following a 1978 vote in which the International Gymnastics Federation voted to accept the People's Republic of China as a member.

Results

Men

Team final 

The Soviet Union's first-place finish made them the first team since 1960 to beat Japan at an Olympics or World Championships. The United States' bronze medal was their first team medal and best result yet.

All-around

Floor exercise

Pommel horse

Rings

Vault

Parallel bars

Horizontal bar

Women

Team final

All-around

Vault

Uneven bars

Balance beam

Floor exercise

Medals

References 

World Artistic Gymnastics Championships
1979 in gymnastics
1979 in American sports
International gymnastics competitions hosted by the United States